The 2019–20 Baylor Lady Bears basketball team represented Baylor University in the 2019–20 NCAA Division I women's basketball season. Returning as head coach was Hall of Famer Kim Mulkey for her 20th season. The team played their home games at the Ferrell Center in Waco, Texas and were members of the Big 12 Conference.

Previous season
The Lady Bears finished the 2018–19 season ranked #1 in the nation, with a record of 37–1, 18–0 in Big 12 to win the Big 12 regular season title. They also won the Big 12 women's tournament and earned an automatic bid to the NCAA women's tournament, where they advanced to defeat Notre Dame in the championship game for the third title in team history.

Roster

Rankings

^Coaches did not release a Week 2 poll

Schedule

|-
!colspan=6 style=| Exhibition

|-
!colspan=9 style=| Regular season

|-
!colspan=9 style=| Big 12 Women's Tournament

References

Baylor Bears women's basketball seasons
Baylor